This is a list of diplomatic missions of Hungary, excluding honorary consulates. Hungary has redefined itself as a medium-sized power in Central Europe, and recently has joined NATO (1999) and the European Union (2004).  Its network of embassies and consulates abroad reflect its foreign policy priorities in Western Europe, and in neighbouring countries that Hungary has historic links to.

Current missions

Africa

Americas

Asia

Europe

Oceania

Multilateral organizations
 Brussels (delegations to the European Union and NATO)
 Geneva (mission to the Office of the United Nations and the World Trade Organization)
 New York City (mission to the United Nations)
 Paris (delegations to UNESCO)
 Strasbourg (permanent representation to the Council of Europe)
 Vienna (mission to the Office of the United Nations and delegation to the Organization for Security and Co-operation in Europe)

Gallery

Closed missions

Africa

Asia

Americas

See also
 Foreign relations of Hungary

Notes

References

  Ministry of Foreign Affairs of the Republic of Hungary

 
Diplomatic missions
Hungary